The 1924 Holland with Boston by-election was a by-election held on 31 July 1924 for the British House of Commons constituency of Holland with Boston in Lincolnshire.

The by-election was caused by the death of the town's Labour Member of Parliament (MP) William Stapleton Royce, who had held the seat since its creation for the 1918 general election. The  Liberal candidate was the son of Sir Richard Winfrey, MP for South West Norfolk from 1906–1923 and Gainsborough from 1923-24.

The result was a victory for the Conservative Party candidate Arthur Dean.

Votes

References

Sources

See also 
 Holland with Boston constituency
 1929 Holland with Boston by-election
 1937 Holland with Boston by-election
 List of United Kingdom by-elections (1918–1931)

Holland with Boston by-election
Holland with Boston by-election
Holland with Boston by-election
By-elections to the Parliament of the United Kingdom in Lincolnshire constituencies